Al-Dirdara, also known as Mazari ed Daraja, was a Palestinian Arab village in the Safad Subdistrict. It was depopulated during the 1947–1948 Civil War in Mandatory Palestine on May 1, 1948, under Operation Yiftach. It was located 13 km east of Safad.

In 1945 it had a population of 100.

History
The village was located in the middle of a flat plain overlooking the Hula Valley Plain to the north and south. The villagers cultivated grain, vegetables, citrus, almonds, and figs.

In  1944/5 it had a population of 100 Muslims, with a total of 6,361 dunums of land. Of this,  1,623  were used for  cereal, 795  were irrigated or used for orchards,   while 2,025 dunams were classified as non-cultivable land.

The Jewish settlement of Eyal was founded on village land in 1947, but was destroyed in the 1948 war.

1948, aftermath

The precise date is not clear when al-Dirdara was occupied by Israeli forces but is believed to have been late April or early May. By July 1948 Israeli forces controlled the villages, although Syrian forces had tried to recapture the village but were forced to withdraw, losing over fifty men. They signed an armistice agreement in July 1949, creating a demilitarized zone.

After the Al-Dirdara Palestinian inhabitants had been expelled, Israel tried to resettle Eyal, this time calling it ha-Goeverim. In 1953, they changed the name to Ashmura. Pr. 1992 it was not inhabited.

In 1992 the village site was described: "The site is a mound of stones and earth, overgrown with trees. There is a canal at the northern edge through which water flows in a north-south direction. The area around the site is cultivated."

References

Bibliography

External links
Welcome to al-Dirdara
al-Dirdara, Zochrot
 al-Dirdara at Khalil Sakakini Cultural Center
 al-Dirdara, Dr. Khalil Rizk.

Arab villages depopulated during the 1948 Arab–Israeli War
District of Safad